Regents Park Community College is a mixed Comprehensive School in West Southampton, Hampshire, in the south of England.  The most recent Ofsted inspection was in April 2018 when the inspectors reported that "Teaching is characterised by highly effective planning, secure subject knowledge among the teachers, the use of a wide range of teaching strategies and the use of detailed information about pupils." The Ofsted report can be found here

Previously, Regents Park had been placed into special measures during the 10–11 July 2013 Ofsted inspection, after being rated 'inadequate'.

Acceptance of boys
As part of Southampton City Council's review of secondary education, called "Learning Futures", the school started accepting boys from September 2008. .

Southampton Cooperative Learning Trust

The school has a group called the Southampton Cooperative Learning Trust or The Regents Park Family of Schools. The group contains a number of schools in Southampton: 
Banister Infant & Nursery School 
Foundry Lane Primary School
Freemantle C of E Academy
Regents Park Community College
St Johns Primary & Nursery School
St Mark's Primary School

Notable former pupils
Len Stansbridge (1919–1986), goalkeeper for Southampton in the period either side of the Second World War.
Manisha Tank, former BBC World presenter, and currently with CNN.

References

External links
 The school's website
 Learning Futures website
 The school on Ofsted's website

 

Secondary schools in Southampton
Foundation schools in Southampton
Training schools in England